Nine One One is a Taiwanese hip hop group from Taichung, Taiwan, composed of Hung Yuhung (洪瑜鴻), Liao Chien-chih (廖建至), and Chern Hawyeu (陳皓宇). The group was formed on September 11, 2009 and began performing at temple festivals and night clubs. In 2016, the group was nominated for Best Group at the 27th Golden Melody Awards and was invited to perform at the venue. The music video for Nine One One's 2015 single "9453", featuring scenery from Penghu County, has been viewed over 50 million times on YouTube.

References

External links 
Official Page

Taiwanese hip hop groups